The Internal Macedonian Revolutionary Organization (IMRO;), was a secret revolutionary society founded in the Ottoman territories in Europe,  that operated in the late 19th and early 20th centuries.

Founded in 1893 in Salonica, initially, it aimed to gain autonomy for Macedonia and Adrianople regions in the Ottoman Empire, however, later it became an agent serving Bulgarian interests in Balkan politics. IMRO group modeled itself after the Internal Revolutionary Organization of Vasil Levski and accepted its motto "Freedom or Death" (Свобода или смърть). Starting in 1896, it fought the Ottomans using guerrilla tactics, and in this, they were successful, even establishing a state within a state in some regions, including their tax collectors. This effort escalated in 1903 into the Ilinden–Preobrazhenie Uprising. The fighting involved about 15,000 IMRO irregulars and 40,000 Ottoman soldiers. After the uprising failed, and the Ottomans destroyed some 100 villages, the IMRO resorted to more systematic forms of terrorism targeting civilians. During the Balkan Wars and the First World War, the organization supported the Bulgarian army and joined Bulgarian war-time authorities when they temporarily took control over parts of Thrace and Macedonia. In this period, autonomism as a political tactic was abandoned, and annexationist positions were supported, aiming eventual incorporation of occupied areas into Bulgaria.

After the First World War the combined Macedonian-Thracian revolutionary movement separated into two detached organizations, IMRO and ITRO. After this moment the IMRO earned a reputation as an ultimate terror network, seeking to change state frontiers in the Macedonian regions of Greece and Serbia (later Yugoslavia). They contested the partitioning of Macedonia and launched raids from their Petrich stronghold into Greek and Yugoslav territory. Their base of operation in Bulgaria was jeopardized by the Treaty of Niš, and the IMRO reacted by assassinating Bulgarian prime minister Aleksandar Stamboliyski in 1923, with the cooperation of other Bulgarian elements opposed to him. In 1925 the Greek army launched a cross-border operation to reduce the IMRO base area, but it was ultimately stopped by the League of Nations, and IMRO attacks resumed. In the interwar period the IMRO also cooperated with the Croatian Ustaše, and their ultimate victim was Alexander I of Yugoslavia, assassinated in France in 1934. After the Bulgarian coup d'état of 1934, their Petrich stronghold was subjected to a military crackdown by the Bulgarian army, and the IMRO was reduced to a marginal phenomenon.

The organization changed its name on several occasions. After the fall of communism in the region, numerous parties claimed the IMRO name and lineage to legitimize themselves. Among them, in Bulgaria a right-wing party carrying the prefix "VMRO" was established in the 1990s, while in the Republic of Macedonia a right-wing party was established under the name "VMRO-DPMNE".

Ottoman era

Origins and goals 
The organization was founded in 1893 in Ottoman Thessaloniki by a small band of anti-Ottoman Macedono-Bulgarian revolutionaries, who considered Macedonia an indivisible territory and claimed all of its inhabitants "Macedonians", no matter their religion or ethnicity. In practice, IMRO was established by Bulgarians and most of their followers were Bulgarians. The organization was a secret revolutionary society operating in the late 19th and early 20th centuries with the goal of autonomous Macedonia and Adrianople regions. Initially, they were against the aspirations of neighboring states in the area and saw the future autonomous Macedonia and Southern Thrace as a multi-ethnic entity. It appears likely that at the early stages of the struggle, a desired outcome of the autonomy was unification with Bulgaria. This aim was changed later with the idea of transforming the Balkans into a federal state, in which Macedonia and Thrace would enter as equal members. The idea of autonomy was strictly political and did not imply a secession from Bulgarian ethnicity. Even those, who advocated for independent Macedonia and Thrace, never doubted the predominantly Bulgarian character of the Slavic population in both areas. The organization was founded by Hristo Tatarchev, Dame Gruev, Petar Pop-Arsov, Andon Dimitrov, Hristo Batandzhiev and Ivan Hadzhinikolov. Most of them (with the exception of Ivan Hadzhinikolov) were closely connected with the Bulgarian Men's High School of Thessaloniki. According to Hristo Tatarchev's "Memoirs", IMRO was first called simply the Macedonian Revolutionary Organization (MRO). Ivan Hadzhinikolov in his memoirs lists the five basic principles of the MRO's foundation:

According to Dr. Hristo Tatarchev:

In Dame Gruev's memoirs, the MRO's goals are stated as follows:

The Adrianople Region was the general name given by the Organization to those areas of Thrace which, like Macedonia, had been left under Turkish rule i.e. most of it, where the Bulgarian element predominated in the mixed population, too. The organized revolutionary movement in Thrace dates from 1895, when Dame Gruev recruited Hristo Kotsev, born in Shtip, who was then a teacher in the Bulgarian Men's High School of Adrianople. Acting in the name of the Central Committee, Kotsev set up a regional committee in Adrianople, and gradually committees were established in a large area.

Based on historical evidences, it is believed by Bulgarian, Western and Russian historians that in 1896 or 1897 this first and probably unofficial name was changed to Bulgarian Macedonian-Adrianople Revolutionary Committees (BMARC); and the organisation existed under this name until 1902, when it was changed to Secret Macedonian-Adrianople Revolutionary Organization (SMARO). While part of the Macedonian historians also acknowledge the existence of the name "ВMARC" in the very early period of the Organisation (1894–1896), in the Republic of Macedonia it is generally assumed that in the 1896–1902 period the name of the organization was "SMARO". Both sides lack conclusive documentary evidence, as neither of these names appears in the IMRO documents but is known from undated printed or handwritten statutes. However, Macedonian historians point to the fact that a copy of the "SMARO" statute is kept in London under the year of 1898. It is not disputed that the organization changed its name to Internal Macedonian-Adrianople Revolutionary Organization (IMARO) in 1905 and it is under this name referred to in Bulgarian historiography. After disbanding itself during the first Bulgarian annexation of Macedonia (1915–1918), the organization was revived in 1920 under the name Internal Macedonian Revolutionary Organization (IMRO), under which it is generally known today.

The stated goal of the original Committee was to unite all elements dissatisfied with the Ottoman oppression in Macedonia and the Adrianople Vilayet, eventually obtaining political autonomy for the two regions. In this task, the organisation hoped to enlist the support of the local Aromanians and Megleno-Romanians, Greeks and even Turks. Efforts were concentrated on moral propaganda and the prospect of rebellion and terrorist actions seemed distant. The organization developed quickly: only in a matter of a few years, the Committee had managed to establish a wide network of local organisations across Macedonia and the Adrianople Vilayet. These usually centered around the schools of the Bulgarian Exarchate and had as leaders local or Bulgarian-born teachers.

Although IMRO was predominantly ethnic Bulgarian since its establishment, it favoured the idea of an autonomous Macedonia and preferred to disassociate itself from official Bulgarian policy and was not under government control. Its founding leaders believed that an autonomous movement was more likely to find favour with the Great Powers than one which was a tool of the Bulgarian government.  In the words of British contemporary observer Henry Brailsford:

What is more, some of its younger leaders espoused radical socialist and anarchist ideas and saw their goal as the establishment of a new form of government rather than unification with Bulgaria. Eventually, these considerations led the organisation to change its statute and accept as members not only Bulgarians but all Macedonians and Odrinians regardless of ethnicity or creed. In reality, however, besides some Aromanian members, its membership remained overwhelmingly Bulgarian Exarchist.

In regard to the socialist and cosmopolitan ideas within the revolutionary movement, the American Albert Sonnichsen says:

It is claimed by contemporary historians that the right wing supporters within the IMRO were probably much more likely to see unification with Bulgaria as a natural final outcome of Macedonian autonomy. Among other documents, they cite as an expression of this understanding the official letter that Dame Gruev and Boris Sarafov, leaders of the headquarters of the Second Macedonian-Adrianople revolutionary district during the Ilinden uprising, wrote to the Bulgarian government:

In his Macedonistic publication On Macedonian Matters written in the wake of the Ilinden-Preobrazhenie uprising, Krste Misirkov, a highly controversial writer who alternated between pan-Bulgarian and pan-Macedonian nationalism throughout his lifetime, described the IMARO as an organization of Bulgarian officials who work for Bulgarian interests and who are linked in name, and in church and school matters, to the people of Bulgaria, their country and their interests. Misirkov wrote:

Dimitar Vlahov, another extremely controversial politician and revolutionary, who also alternated between pan-Bulgarian and pan-Macedonian nationalism, member of the left wing of the Macedonian-Adrianople revolutionary movement, later Bulgarian deputy in Ottoman Parliament, afterwards one of the main leaders of IMRO (United) – de facto extension of the Bulgarian Communist Party, finally elected in 1946 as ethnic Macedonian vice-president of the Praesidium of Communist Yugoslavia's Parliament, expressed in his book "The struggles of Macedonian people for freedom", published in Vienna in 1925, his view, confirmed again in Vlahov's "Memoirs", published in Skopje in 1970:

Armed struggle against the Ottomans 
The initial period of idealism for IMARO ended, however, with the Vinitsa Affair and the discovery by the Ottoman police of a secret depot of ammunition near the Bulgarian border in 1897. The wide-scale repressions against the activists of the Committee led to its transformation into a militant guerilla organization, which engaged into attacks against Ottoman officials and punitive actions against suspected traitors. The guerilla groups of IMARO, known as "chetas" (чети) later (after 1903) also waged a war against the pro-Serbian and pro-Greek armed groups during the Greek Struggle for Macedonia.

IMARO's leadership of the revolutionary movement was challenged by two other factions: the Macedonian Supreme Committee in Sofia (Vurhoven makedono-оdrinski komitet – Върховен македоно-одрински комитет) and a smaller group of conservatives in Salonica – Bulgarian Secret Revolutionary Brotherhood (Balgarsko Tayno Revolyutsionno Bratstvo). The latter was incorporated in IMARO by 1902 but its members as Ivan Garvanov, were to exert a significant influence on the organization. 

They were to push for the Ilinden-Preobrazhenie Uprising and later became the core of IMRO right-wing faction. The former organisation became known earlier than IMRO, after the 1895 raids into Turkish territory it organised from Bulgaria. Its founders were Macedonian immigrants in Bulgaria as well as Bulgarian army officers. They became known as the "supremists" or "externals" since they were based outside of Macedonia. The supremists resorted to terrorism against the Ottomans in the hope of provoking a war and thus Bulgarian annexation of Macedonia. For a time in the late 1890s IMARO leaders managed to gain control of the Supreme Committee but it soon split into two factions: one loyal to the IMARO and one led by some officers close to the Bulgarian prince. The second one staged an ill-fated uprising in Eastern Macedonia in 1902, where they were opposed militarily by local IMARO bands led by Yane Sandanski and Hristo Chernopeev, who were later to become the leaders of the IMARO left wing. 

In Spring 1903, a group by young anarchists connected with IMARO from the Gemidzhii Circle – graduates from the Bulgarian secondary school in Thessaloniki – launched a campaign of terror bombing with the aim to attract the attention of the Great Powers to Ottoman oppression in Macedonia and Eastern Thrace.

In the same time the undisputed leader of the organization, Gotse Delchev, was killed in a skirmish with Turkish forces. Although Delchev had opposed the ideas for an uprising as premature, he finally had no choice but agree to that course of action but at least managed to delay its start from May to August. After his death in 1903 IMARO organised the Ilinden-Preobrazhenie Uprising against the Ottomans in Macedonia and the Adrianople Vilayet, which after the initial successes including the forming of the Krushevo Republic, was crushed with much loss of life.

After Ilinden 

The failure of the 1903 insurrection resulted in the eventual split of the IMARO into a left-wing (federalist) faction in the Seres and Strumica districts and a right-wing faction (centralists) in the Salonica, Monastir, and Uskub (present-day Skopje) districts. The left-wing faction opposed Bulgarian nationalism and advocated the creation of a Balkan Socialist Federation with equality for all subjects and nationalities. The Supreme Macedonian Committee was disbanded in 1903 but the centralist faction of the IMORO drifted more and more towards Bulgarian nationalism as its regions became increasingly exposed to the incursions of Serb and Greek armed bands, which started infiltrating Macedonia after 1903. The years 1905–1907 saw much fighting between IMORO and Turkish forces as well as between IMORO and Greek and Serb detachments. Meanwhile, the split between the two factions became final when in 1907 Todor Panitza killed the right-wing activists Boris Sarafov and Ivan Garvanov. The armed Albanian bands of Çerçiz Topulli cooperated and were on good terms with armed groups of Bulgarian-Macedonian revolutionaries operating in the Lake Prespa region and Kastoria area, a bond formed due to their hostility toward Greeks.

After the Young Turk Revolution of 1908 both factions laid down their arms and joined the legal struggle. Yane Sandanski and Hristo Chernopeev contacted the Young Turks and started legal operation. They tried to set up the Macedonian-Adrianople Revolutionary Organization (MARO). Initially, the group developed only propaganda activities. Later, the congress for MARO's official inauguration failed and federalist wing joined mainstream political life as the Peoples' Federative Party (Bulgarian Section). Some of its leaders like Sandanski and Chernopeev participated in the march on Istanbul to depose the counter-revolutionaries. The former centralists formed the Union of the Bulgarian Constitutional Clubs and like the PFP participated in Ottoman elections. Soon, however, the Young Turk regime turned increasingly nationalist and sought to suppress the national aspirations of the various minorities in Macedonia and Thrace. This prompted most right-wing and some left-wing IMARO leaders to resume the armed fight in 1909. In January 1910 Hristo Chernopeev and some of his followers founded a Bulgarian People's Macedonian-Adrianople Revolutionary Organization. In 1911 a new Central Committee of IMARO was formed consisting of Todor Alexandrov, Hristo Chernopeev and Petar Chaulev. Its aim was to restore unity to the Organisation and direct the new armed struggle against the Turks more efficiently. After Chernopeev was killed in action in 1915 as a Bulgarian officer in World War I, he was replaced by the former supremist leader General Alexander Protogerov.

Balkan Wars and World War I
During the Balkan Wars former IMARO leaders of both the left and the right joined the Macedonian-Adrianopolitan Volunteer Corps and fought with the Bulgarian Army. Others like Sandanski with their bands assisted the Bulgarian army with its advance and still others penetrated as far as the region of Kastoria southwestern Macedonia. In the Second Balkan War IMORO bands fought the Greeks and Serbs behind the front lines but were subsequently routed and driven out. Notably, Petar Chaulev was one of the leaders of the Ohrid-Debar Uprising organised jointly by IMORO and the Albanians of Western Macedonia.
 

The Tikvesh Uprising was another uprising in late June 1913, organized by the Internal Macedonian Revolutionary Organization against the Serbian occupation of Vardar Macedonia and took place behind the Serbian enemy lines during the Second Balkan War.

The result of the Balkan Wars was that the Macedonian region and Adrianople Thrace was partitioned between Bulgaria, Greece, Serbia and the Ottoman Empire (the new state of Yugoslavia was created as after 1918 and started its existence as Kingdom of the Serbs, Croats and Slovenians "SHS"), with Bulgaria getting the smallest share. In 1913 the whole Thracian Bulgarian population from the Ottoman part of Eastern Thrace was forcibly expelled to Bulgaria. IMARO, now led by Todor Aleksandrov, maintained its existence in Bulgaria, where it played a role in politics by playing upon Bulgarian irredentism and urging a renewed war to liberate Macedonia. This was one factor in Bulgaria allying itself with Germany and Austria-Hungary in World War I. During the First World War in Macedonia (1915–1918) the organization supported Bulgarian army and joined to Bulgarian war-time authorities when they took control over Vardar Macedonia temporarily until the end of war. In this period the autonomism as political tactics was abandoned from all internal IMARO streams and all of them shared annexationist positions, supporting eventual incorporation of Macedonia in Bulgaria. IMARO organised the Valandovo action of 1915, which was an attack on a large Serbian force. Bulgarian army, supported by the organization's forces, was successful in the first stages of this conflict, managed to drive out the Serbian forces from Vardar Macedonia and came into positions on the line of the pre-war Greek-Serbian border, which was stabilized as a firm front until end of 1918.

After 1917 the Bulgarian government started using paramilitary groups to gain control over the internal situation in both Pomoravlje and Macedonia. Aleksandar Protogerov who headed the Bulgarian occupation troops in Morava region crushed the uprising in the Toplica district with the help of IMRO irregulars. Bulgarians paramilitary groups were responsible for multiple instances of war crimes committing during the war in the parts of the Kingdom of Serbia under Bulgarian occupation.

On the eve of outbreak of World War I, IMRO paramilitary activity in Serbia aimed to provoke a war with Bulgaria. At that time Serbia implemented in Macedonia a program of forced Serbianization. In an incident during 1914, when Bulgaria was still neutral, ca. 2,000 strong IMRO-cheta attacked a railway bridge over the Vardar River, massacring 477 men. In another incident in the same year, the first Macedonian recruits mobilized into the Serbian army demonstratively refused to take the military oath in Kragujevac, and were subjected to repression. As result IMRO set up a secret committee in Veles, which aim was to coordinate the transfer to Bulgaria of thousands of Macedonian deserters by the Serbian army. Later its comitadjis were incorporated into the regular Bulgarian Army and its power grew in significance. The fact that these paramilitary companies joined the Bulgarian Army marked a significant change in the way they were conducting war. At the beginning it formed the 11th Macedonian Infantry Division, and later other units, as for example guerilla companies. Its entrance into the war towards the end of 1915 contributed to the defeat and occupation of Serbia, and the unification of Macedonia with Bulgaria. In Serbia the IMRO activity was identical with the Bulgarian policy, supporting the Bulgarization of the area. At the end of 1915 and the beginning of 1916 several massacres of (sic) Serbomans were conducted in Vardar Macedonia in the areas of Azot, Skopska Crna Gora and Poreče by IMRO-irregulars, aided by the guerrilla companies of the 11th Macedonian Infantry Division. The police chief of the Military Inspection Area of Macedonia reported to the interior minister that he cannot deal with the lawlessness of the paramilitaries. In fact 1917 was the turning point when IMRO became the instrument used by the Bulgarian government to gain control over the internal situation in the Pomoravlje and most from the region of Macedonia. At that time the IMRO leaders as general Aleksandar Protogerov headed the Bulgarian occupation troops in Morava region and crushed the uprising in the Toplica district with the help by IMRO irregulars. Their methods caused death of thousand people, destruction of their property, looting and other war crimes committed during the war in the parts of the Kingdom of Serbia under Bulgarian control.

Interwar period 

The post-war Treaty of Neuilly again denied Bulgaria what it felt was its share of Macedonia and Thrace. After this moment the combined Macedonian-Adrianopolitan revolutionary movement separated into two detached organizations: Internal Thracian Revolutionary Organisation (bulg. Вътрешна тракийска революционна организация) and Internal Macedonian Revolutionary Organisation. ITRO was a revolutionary organisation active in the Greek regions of Thrace and Macedonia to the river Strymon and Rhodope Mountains between 1922 and 1934. The reason for the establishment of ITRO was the transfer of the region from Bulgaria to Greece in May 1920. ITRO proclaimed its goal as the "unification of all the disgruntled elements in Thrace regardless of their nationality", and to win full political independence for the region. Later IMRO created as a satellite organisation the Internal Western Outland Revolutionary Organisation (bulg. Вътрешна западнопокрайненска революционна организация), which operated in the areas of Tsaribrod and Bosilegrad, ceded to Yugoslavia. IMRO began sending armed bands called cheti into Greek and Yugoslav Macedonia and Thrace to assassinate officials and stir up the spirit of the oppressed population. On 23 March 1923 Aleksandar Stamboliyski, who favoured a détente with Greece and Yugoslavia, so that Bulgaria could concentrate on its internal problems, signed the Treaty of Niš with the Kingdom of Serbs, Croats and Slovenes and undertook the obligation to suppress the operations of the IMRO carried out from Bulgarian territory. However, in the same year IMRO agents assassinated him. IMRO had de facto full control of Pirin Macedonia (the Petrich District of the time) and acted as a "state within a state", which it used as a base for hit and run attacks against Yugoslavia with the unofficial support of the right-wing Bulgarian government and later Fascist Italy. Because of this, contemporary observers described the Yugoslav-Bulgarian frontier as the most fortified in Europe. 

In 1923 and 1924 during the apogee of interwar military activity according to IMRO statistics in the region of Yugoslav (Vardar) Macedonia operated 53 chetas (armed bands), 36 of which penetrated from Bulgaria, 12 were local and 5 entered from Albania. The aggregate membership of the bands was 3245 komitas (guerilla rebels) led by 79 voivodas (commanders), 54 subcommanders, 41 secretaries and 193 couriers. 119 fights and 73 terroristic acts were documented. Serbian casualties were 304 army and gendarmery officers, soldiers and paramilitary fighters, more than 1300 were wounded. IMRO lost 68 voivodas and komitas, hundreds were wounded. In the region of Greek (Aegean) Macedonia 24 chetas and 10 local reconnaissance detachments were active. The aggregate membership of the bands was 380 komitas led by 18 voivodas, 22 subcommanders, 11 secretaries and 25 couriers. 42 battles and 27 terrorist acts were performed. Greek casualties were 83 army officers, soldiers and paramilitary fighters, over 230 were wounded. IMRO lost 22 voivodas and komitas, 48 were wounded. Thousands of locals were repressed by the Yugoslav and Greek authorities on suspicions of contacts with the revolutionary movement. The population in Pirin Macedonia was organized in a mass people's home guard. This militia was the only force, which resisted the Greek army when the Greek dictator, General Pangalos launched a military campaign against Petrich District in 1925. In 1934 the Bulgarian army confiscated 10,938 rifles, 637 pistols, 47 machine-guns, 7 mortars and 701,388 cartridges only in the Petrich and Kyustendil Districts. At the same time, a youth's extension of IMRO, the Macedonian Youth Secret Revolutionary Organization was created. The statute of MYSRO was approved personally from IMRO's leader Todor Alexandrov. The aim of MYSRO was in concordance with the statute of IMRO – unification of all of Macedonia in an authonomous unit, within a future Balkan Federative Republic.

The Sixth Congress of the Balkan Communist Federation under the leadership of the Bulgarian communist Vasil Kolarov and the Fifth Congress of the Comintern, an adjunct of the Soviet foreign policy, held concurrently in Moscow in 1923, voted for the formation of an "Autonomous and Independent Macedonia and Thrace." In 1924 IMRO entered negotiations with the Macedonian Federative Organization and the Comintern about collaboration between the communists and the Macedonian movement and the creation of a united Macedonian movement. The idea for a new unified organization was supported by the Soviet Union, which saw a chance for using this well developed revolutionary movement to spread revolution in the Balkans and destabilize the Balkan monarchies. Alexandrov defended IMRO's independence and refused to concede on practically all points requested by the Communists. No agreement was reached except for a paper "Manifesto" (the so-called May Manifesto of 6 May 1924), in which the objectives of the unified Macedonian liberation movement were presented: independence and unification of partitioned Macedonia, fighting all the neighbouring Balkan monarchies, forming a Balkan Communist Federation and cooperation with the Soviet Union. Failing to secure Alexandrov's cooperation, the Comintern decided to discredit him and published the contents of the Manifesto on 28 July 1924 in the "Balkan Federation" newspaper. VMRO's leaders Todor Aleksandrov and Aleksandar Protogerov promptly denied through the Bulgarian press that they've ever signed any agreements, claiming that the May Manifesto was a communist forgery.
 Shortly after, Todor Alexandrov was assassinated in unclear circumstances and IMRO came under the leadership of Ivan Mihailov, who became a powerful figure in Bulgarian politics. While IMRO's leadership was quick to ascribe Alexandrov's murder to the communists and even quicker to organise a revenge action against the immediate perpetrators, there is some doubt that Mihailov himself might have been responsible for the murder. Some Bulgarian and Macedonian historians like Zoran Todorovski speculate that it might have been the circle around Mihailov who organised the assassination on inspiration by the Bulgarian government, which was afraid of united IMRO-Communist action against it. However, neither version is corroborated by conclusive historical evidence. The result of the murder was further strife within the organisation and several high-profile murders, including that of Petar Chaulev (who led the Ohrid-Debar Uprising against the Serbian occupation) in Milan and ultimately Protogetov himself.

In this interwar period IMRO led by Aleksandrov and later by Mihailov took actions against the former left-wing assassinating several former members of IMORO's Sandanist wing, who meanwhile had gravitated towards the Bulgarian Communist Party and Macedonian Federative Organization. Gjorche Petrov was killed in Sofia in 1922, Todor Panitsa (who previously killed the right-wing oriented Boris Sarafov and Ivan Garvanov) was assassinated in Vienna in 1924 by Mihailov's future wife Mencha Karnichiu. Dimo Hadjidimov, Georgi Skrizhovski, Alexander Bujnov, Chudomir Kantardjiev and many others were killed in the events of 1925.  Meanwhile, the left-wing later did form the new organisation based on the principles previously presented in the May Manifesto. The new organization which was an opponent to Mihailov's IMRO was called IMRO (United) was founded in 1925 in Vienna. However, it did not have real popular support and remained based abroad with no revolutionary activities in Macedonia. Mihailov's group of young IMRO cadres soon got into conflict with the older guard of the organization. The latter were in favour of the old tactic of incursions by armed bands, whereas the former favoured more flexible tactics with smaller terrorist groups carrying selective assassinations. The conflict grew into a leadership struggle and Mihailov soon, in turn, ordered the assassination in 1928 of a rival leader, General Aleksandar Protogerov, which sparked a fratricidal war between "Mihailovists" and "Protogerovists". The less numerous Protogerovists soon became allied with Yugoslavia and certain Bulgarian military circles with fascist leanings and who favoured rapprochement with Yugoslavia. The policy of assassinations was effective in making Serbian rule in Vardar Macedonia feel insecure but in turn provoked brutal reprisals on the local peasant population. Having lost a lot of popular support in Vardar Macedonia due to his policies, Mihailov favoured the "internationalization" of the Macedonian question.

He established close links with the Croatian Ustashi and Italy. Numerous assassinations were carried out by IMRO agents in many countries, the majority in Yugoslavia. The most spectacular of these was the assassination of King Alexander I of Yugoslavia and the French Foreign Minister Louis Barthou in Marseille in 1934 in collaboration with the Croatian Ustashi. The killing was carried out by the VMRO assassin Vlado Chernozemski and happened after the suppression of IMRO following the 19 May 1934 military coup in Bulgaria. IMRO's constant fratricidal killings and assassinations abroad provoked some within Bulgarian military after the coup of 19 May 1934 to take control and break the power of the organization, which had come to be seen as a gangster organization inside Bulgaria and a band of assassins outside it. In 1934 Mihailov was forced to escape to Turkey. He ordered to his supporters not to resist to the Bulgarian army and to accept the disarmament peacefully, thus avoiding fratricides, destabilization of Bulgaria, civil war or external invasion. Many inhabitants of Pirin Macedonia met this disbandment with satisfaction because it was perceived as relief from an unlawful and quite often brutal parallel authority. IMRO kept its organization alive in exile in various countries but ceased to be an active force in Macedonian politics except for brief moments during World War II. Meanwhile, a resolution of the Comintern for recognition of a distinct ethnic Macedonian ethnicity, which was accepted also by the Internal Macedonian Revolutionary Organization (United), was published in January 1934. IMRO (United) remained active until 1936 when it was absorbed into the Balkan Communist Federation.

IMRO used at that time, what the American journalist H. R. Knickerbocker described as: "the only system I ever heard of to guarantee that their members carry out assigned assassinations, no matter what the police terror might be".

Second World War period 

As the Bulgarian army entered Yugoslav Vardar Macedonia in 1941, it was greeted by most of the population as liberators and former IMRO members were active in organising Bulgarian Action Committees, charged with taking over the local authorities. Some former IMRO (United) members, such as Metodi Shatorov, who was the regional leader of the Yugoslav Communist Party, also refused to define the Bulgarian forces as occupiers, contrary to instructions from Belgrade and called for the incorporation of the local Macedonian Communist organisations within the Bulgarian Communist Party. This policy changed towards 1943 with the arrival of the Montenegrin Svetozar Vukmanović-Tempo, who began in earnest to organise armed resistance to the Bulgarian occupation. Many former IMRO members assisted the authorities in fighting Tempo's partizans.

In Greece the Bulgarian troops, following on the heels of the German invasion of the country, occupied the whole of Eastern Macedonia and Western Thrace. In eastern and central Macedonia, some of the local Slavic-speaking minority greeted the Bulgarian troops as liberators, and efforts were undertaken by the Bulgarian authorities to "instill in them a Bulgarian national identity". Bulgaria officially annexed the occupied territories in Yugoslavia and Greece, which had long been a target of Bulgarian irredentism. IMRO was also active in organising Bulgarian militias in Italian and German occupation zones against Greek nationalist and communist groups as EAM-ELAS and EDES. With the help of Mihailov and Macedonian emigres in Sofia, several pro-Bulgarian armed detachments "Ohrana" were organised in the Kastoria, Florina and Edessa districts. These were led by Bulgarian officers originally from Greek Macedonia – Andon Kalchev and Georgi Dimchev. It was apparent that Mihailov had broader plans which envisaged the creation of a Macedonian state under a German control. It was also anticipated that the IMRO volunteers would form the core of the armed forces of a future Independent Macedonia in addition to providing administration and education in the Florina, Kastoria and Edessa districts.

On 2 August 1944 (in what in the Republic of Macedonia is referred to as the Second Ilinden) in the St. Prohor Pčinjski monastery at the Antifascist assembly of the national liberation of Macedonia (ASNOM) with Panko Brashnarov (the former IMRO revolutionary from the Ilinden period and the IMRO United) as a first speaker, the modern Macedonian state was officially proclaimed, as a federal state within Tito's Yugoslavia, receiving recognition from the Allies. After the declaration of war by Bulgaria on Germany, in September 1944 Mihailov arrived in German-occupied Skopje, where the Germans hoped that he could form a pro-German Independent State of Macedonia with their support. Seeing that the war is lost to Germany and to avoid further bloodshed, he refused. Mihailov eventually ended up in Rome where he published numerous articles, books and pamphlets on the Macedonian Question.

Post-war period 

Members of the IMRO (United) participated in the forming of SR Macedonia a federal state of Socialist Federal Republic of Yugoslavia and some of the leading members entered the government: Dimitar Vlahov, Panko Brashnarov, Pavel Shatev (the latter was the last surviving member of "Gemidzhii", the group that executed the Thessaloniki bombings of 1903). However, they were quickly ousted by cadres loyal to the Yugoslav Communist Party in Belgrade, who had had pro-Serbian leanings before the war.  According to Macedonian historian Ivan Katardjiev such Macedonian activists came from IMRO (United) and the Bulgarian Communist Party never managed to get rid of their pro-Bulgarian bias and on many issues opposed the Serbian-educated leaders, who held most of the political power. Pavel Shatev went as far as to send a petition to the Bulgarian legation in Belgrade protesting the anti-Bulgarian policies of the Yugoslav leadership and the Serbianisation of the Bulgarian language.

From the start, the Yugoslav authorities organised frequent purges and trials of Macedonian communists and non-party people charged with autonomist deviation. Many of the left-wing IMRO government officials, including Pavel Shatev and Panko Brashnarov, were purged from their positions, too, then isolated, arrested, imprisoned or executed by the Yugoslav federal authorities on various (in many cases fabricated) charges including: pro-Bulgarian leanings, demands for greater or complete independence of Yugoslav Macedonia, collaboration with the Cominform after the Tito–Stalin split in 1948, forming of conspirative political groups or organisations, demands for greater democracy, etc. One of the victims of these campaigns was Metodija Andonov Cento, a wartime partisan leader and president of ASNOM, who was convicted of having worked for a "completely independent Macedonia" as an IMRO member. A survivor among the communists associated with the idea of Macedonian autonomy was Dimitar Vlahov, who was used "solely for window dressing".

On the other hand, former Mihailovists were also persecuted by the Belgrade-controlled authorities on accusations of collaboration with the Bulgarian occupation, Bulgarian nationalism, anti-communist and anti-Yugoslav activities, etc. Notable victims included Spiro Kitinchev, mayor of Skopje, Ilija Kocarev, mayor of Ohrid and Georgi Karev, the mayor of Krushevo during the Bulgarian occupation and brother of Ilinden revolutionary Nikola Karev. Another IMRO activist, Sterio Guli, son of Pitu Guli, reportedly shot himself upon the arrival of Tito's partisans in Krushevo in despair over what he saw as a second period of Serbian dominance in Macedonia. Also, Shatorov's supporters in Vardar Macedonia, called Sharlisti, were systematically exterminated by the YCP in the autumn of 1944, and repressed for their anti-Yugoslav and pro-Bulgarian political positions.

IMRO's supporters in Bulgarian Pirin Macedonia fared no better. With the help of some former Protogerovists, their main activists were hunted by the Communist police and many of them killed or imprisoned. Because some IMRO supporters openly opposed the then official policy of Communist Bulgaria to promote Macedonian ethnic consciousness in Pirin Macedonia they were repressed or exiled to the interior of Bulgaria. Many from this persecuted people emigrated through Greece and Turkey to Western countries. At this period the American and Greek intelligence services recruited some of them, trained them and later used this so-called "Goryani" as spies and saboteurs, smuggling them back to Communist Bulgaria and Yugoslavia.

Despite the fact that Yugoslav Macedonian historical scholarship reluctantly acknowledged the Bulgarian ethnic self-identification of the Ilinden IMRO leaders, they were adopted in the national pantheon of Yugoslav Macedonia as ethnic Macedonians. Official Yugoslav historiography asserted a continuity between the Ilinden of 1903 and the Ilinden of ASNOM in 1944 ignoring the fact that the first one included the uprising in the Adrianople part of Thrace region as well. The names of the IMRO revolutionaries were Goce Delchev, Pitu Guli, Dame Gruev and Yane Sandanski were included in the lyrics of the anthem of the Socialist Republic of Macedonia Denes nad Makedonija ("Today over Macedonia").

Interpretations during the communist period 

Initially Lazar Koliševski, the leader of the new Yugoslav Republic — SR Macedonia, proclaimed that the Ilinden Uprising and the IMRO were Bulgarian conspiracies. Afterwards the historical studies in the country were expanded under direct political instructions from Belgrade. It was advanced as a key principle of the Macedonian historiography, that its primary goal was to create a separate national consciousness, and to sever any historical ties to Bulgaria. During the Cold War, particularly after the Tito–Stalin split, the heroes of 19th century left-wing IMRO, especially Delchev and Sandanski, were claimed by both Bulgaria and Yugoslavia, both internally and in a tactical game of international diplomacy. One thing that two countries had in common though was that the vague populism and anarchism of these historical figures was interpreted as a definite socialist program. Both regimes recognized the policies of the interwar leaders of the organization Todor Aleksandrov and Ivan Mihailov as "fascist".

In this race, the Socialist Republic of Macedonia was the first to incorporate the IMRO figures in its national pantheon, although some careful exceptions were made. The 1903 Ilinden Uprising was presented as a direct precursor of the 1944 events, which were termed a "Second Ilinden", in an effort to prove the continuity of the struggle for independence of the Macedonian nation. Consequently, it became necessary for the socialist authorities to show that 19th century IMRO figures, particularly Delchev and Sandanski, had been consciously Macedonian in identity. Delchev and Sandanski were adopted as symbols of the republic, had numerous monuments built in their honor, and they were often the topic of articles in the academic journal Macedonian Review, as was the Ilinden Uprising. In contrast, Todor Aleksandrov was labeled a Bulgarian bourgeois chauvinist. The claim to a Macedonian identity of Sandanski was used to bolster Skopje's claim to the Pirin region. According to historians John Lampe and Mark Mazower, IMRO heroes have been important in the creation of a Macedonian national ideology, in both Bulgaria and North Macedonia the historiographies thrive on proving that their version of history is wrong in turn making historical objectivity not important.

In the People's Republic of Bulgaria the situation was more complex, because the IMRO was associated with the 1923–34 anti-communist regime. Before 1960, although the subject was not taboo, few articles on the topic appeared in Bulgarian academic venues, and the IMRO figures were given mostly regional recognition in the Pirin region. After 1960, orders from the highest level were to reincorporate the Macedonian revolutionary movement in the Bulgarian history, and to prove the Bulgarian credentials of their historical leaders. This trend reached its peak in 1981 (the 1300 year anniversary of Bulgarian state), when Delchev and Sandanski were openly made historical symbols of the Bulgarian state in a proclamation of Lyudmila Zhivkova. There were also attempts to rehabilitate Todor Aleksandrov because of his Bulgarian nationalism, but these remained controversial due to his role in suppressing the left wing, a role for which he had been declared a fascist.

After the fall of communism 

With both Bulgaria and Yugoslavia under Communist rule, there was no scope for IMRO's revival.

North Macedonia 

After the fall of Communism in 1989 Yugoslavia began promptly to disintegrate and multi-partyism to emerge. Many exiles returned to Macedonia from abroad, and a new generation of young Macedonian intellectuals rediscovered the history of Macedonian nationalism. In these circumstances, it was not surprising that the IMRO name was revived. A new IMRO was founded on 17 June 1990 in Skopje. Although IMRO claims a line descent from the old IMRO, there is no real connection between the old IMRO and the new one. The party is called the Internal Macedonian Revolutionary Organization-Democratic Party for Macedonian National Unity (In , or VMRO-DPMNE) describes itself as a Christian Democratic party which supports the admission of Macedonia to NATO and the European Union.

A minor political party carrying the name IMRO is the Internal Macedonian Revolutionary Organization–People's Party (VMRO-NP). Although a separate structure since the split in 2004, the political line of VMRO-NP is reminiscent of VMRO-DPMNE's and its members maintain close ties with the latter's party structure.

Bulgaria 

A distinct IMRO organization was also revived in Bulgaria after 1989 first under the name VMRO-SMD (ВМРО-СМД – Съюз на македонските дружества) and then simply VMRO (ВМРО) as a cultural organisation. In 1996 the leaders of the organisation registered it as a political party in Bulgaria under the name IMRO – Bulgarian National Movement (ВМРО – Българско национално движение) and then simply ВМРО–БНД (IMRO-BNM). This group continues to maintain that ethnic Macedonians are in fact Bulgarians.

A small spin-off of the IMRO-BNM was until 2012 IMRO – National Ideal for Unity (ВМРО – Национален идеал за единство) and then simply ВМРО–НИЕ (IMRO-NIU), and uses the flag of IMRO. In 2014, the NIU of the NFSB joined.

See also 
 Velin Alaykov
 Ivan Anastasov
 Dimitar Andonov
 Aleksandar Andreev
 Ivan Angov
 Bulgarian People's Macedonian-Adrianople Revolutionary Organization
 Internal Macedonian Revolutionary Organization (United)
 Internal Revolutionary Organisation
 Internal Thracian Revolutionary Organisation
 Macedonia (region)
 Macedonian Bulgarians
 Macedonian Question
 Ohrana
 Thrace
 Thracian Bulgarians
 United Macedonia
 March of the Macedonian Revolutionaries
 Flags of Internal Macedonian-Adrianople Revolutionary Organization

References

Notes 
  "Illustration Ilinden", Sofia, 1936, b. I, p. 4–5
  "The first central committee of IMRO. Memoirs of d-r Hristo Tatarchev", Materials for the Macedonian liberation movement, book IX (series of the Macedonian scientific institute of IMRO, led by Bulgarian academician prof. Lyubomir Miletich), Sofia, 1928, p. 102, поредица "Материяли за историята на македонското освободително движение" на Македонския научен институт на ВМРО, воден от българския академик проф. Любомир Милетич, книга IX, София, 1928; contemporary Macedonian translation: Tatarchev).
  Materials about the History of the Macedonian Liberation Movement, Book V, Memoirs of Damjan Gruev, Boris Sarafov and Ivan Garvanov, Sofia 1927, pp. 8 – 11; the original in Bulgarian.
  Gjorche Petrov in his memoirs speaking about the Salonica congress of 1896 writes: "There was pointed out the need for a statute and official rules. Until then we had a very short list of rules in force, drafted by Dame (with the oath). That little list was unsystematic, lytographed. It was decided to come up with a full list of rules, a statute. When I came to Sofia, I compiled it there (with Delchev).".
 Пейо Яворов, "Събрани съчинения", Том втори, "Гоце Делчев", Издателство "Български писател", София, 1977, стр. 27: "Тоя събор утвърждава един устав на революционната организация, почти копие на стария български, твърде оригинален с положението, че само еkзархисти българи се приемат за членове на комитетите."  In English: Peyo Yavorov, "Complete Works", Volume 2, biography "Gotse Delchev", Publishing house "Bulgarian writer", Sofia, 1977, p. 27: "This meeting sanctioned a statute of the revolutionary organisation, almost a copy of the old Bulgarian, rather original because of the condition that only Bulgarians Exarchists would be admitted to membership in the committees."
 Пандев, К. "Устави и правилници на ВМОРО преди Илинденско-Преображенското въстание", Исторически преглед, 1969, кн. I, стр. 68–80. 
  Пандев, К. "Устави и правилници на ВМОРО преди Илинденско-Преображенското въстание", Извeстия на Института за история, т. 21, 1970, стр. 250–257. 
  Константин Пандев, Национално-освободителното движение в Македония и Одринско, София, 1979, с. 129–130. (Konstantin Pandev, The National Liberation Movement in Macedonia and the Odrin Region, Sofia 1979, pp. 129–130.)
  Duncan Perry The Politics of Terror: The Macedonian Liberation Movements, 1893–1903 , Durham, Duke University Press, 1988. pp. 40–41, 210 n. 10.
  Fikret Adanir, Die Makedonische Frage: ihre entestehung und etwicklung bis 1908., Wiessbaden 1979, p. 112.
  Академик Иван Катарџиев, "Верувам во националниот имунитет на македонецот", интервју, "Форум". (Academician Ivan Katardžiev, "I believe in Macedonian national immunity", interview, "Forum" magazine.)
  Битоски, Крсте, сп. "Македонско Време", Скопје – март 1997
  Public Record Office – Foreign Office 78/4951 Turkey (Bulgaria). From Elliot. 1898; УСТАВ НА ТМОРО. S. 1. published in Документи за борбата на македонскиот народ за самостојност и за национална држава, Скопје, Универзитет "Кирил и Методиј":Факултет за филозофско-историски науки, 1981, page 331 – 333.
  Prior to the publication of Pandev's article Bulgarian historiography seemed to agree that the name SMARO dates back to 1896/7 (e.g. Silyanov 1933, vol. 1, p. 46). Contemporary Macedonian historians accuse Pandev of a nationalist bias.
  Ivo Banac, The Macedoine (pp. 307–328 in of "The National Question in Yugoslavia. Origins, History, Politics", Cornell University Press, 1984)
  Ivo Banac, The Macedoine (pp. 307–328 in of "The National Question in Yugoslavia. Origins, History, Politics", Cornell University Press, 1984)
  H. N. Brailsford, Macedonia: Its races and their future, Methuen & Co., London, 1906.
  Хр. Силянов, "Освободителнитe борби на Македония, том I", изд. на Илинденската Орг., София, 1933; (Hristo Silyanov, The Liberational Struggles of Macedonia, vol. 1, The Ilinden Organisation, Sofia, 1933.)
  Albert Sonnichsen: Confessions of a Macedonian Bandit: A Californian in the Balkan Wars, Narrative Press, .
  A letter from the headquarters of the Second Macedonian-Adrianople revolutionary district, centered around Monastir (present-day Bitola), represented by Dame Gruev and Boris Sarafov, to Bulgarian government from 9. IX. 1903. Macedonian translation.
  Krste Misirkov, On Macedonian Matters, Sofia, 1933 misirkov.org
  Krste Misirkov, On Macedonian Matters, Sofia, 1933 misirkov.org
  Георги Баждаров, "Моите спомени", издание на Институт "България – Македония", София, 2001, стр. 78–81. (In Bulgarian, In English: Georgi Bazhdarov, "My memoirs", published by the Institute "Bulgaria-Macedonia", Sofia, 2001, pp. 78–81.)
  "ДВИЖЕНИЕТО ОТСАМЪ ВАРДАРА И БОРБАТА СЪ ВЪРХОВИСТИТE по спомени на Яне Сандански, Черньо Пeевъ, Сава Михайловъ, Хр. Куслевъ, Ив. Анастасовъ Гърчето, Петъръ Хр. Юруковъ и Никола Пушкаровъ", съобщава Л. Милетичъ (София, Печатница П. Глушковъ, 1927); Материяли за историята на македонското освободително движение. Издава "Македонскиятъ Наученъ Институтъ". Книга VII. (L. Miletich, ed. Materials on the History of the Macedonian Liberation Movement, Macedonian Scientific Institute, Sofia, 1927 – "The Movement on this Side of the Vardar and the Struggle with the Supremists according to the memories of Jane Sandanski, Chernjo Peev, Sava Mihajlov, Hr. Kuslev, Iv. Anastasov – Grcheto, Petar Hr. Jurukov and Nikola Pushkarov")
  Хр. Силянов, "Освободителнитe борби на Македония, том II", изд. на Илинденската Орг., София, 1933; Silyanov (Hristo Silyanov, The Liberational Struggles of Macedonia, vol. 2, The Ilinden Organisation, Sofia, 1933.)
  Carnegie Endowment for International Peace, Report of the International Commission to Inquire into the causes and Conduct of the Balkan Wars, Published by the Endowment Washington, D.C. 1914.
  Хр. Силянов От Витоша до Грамос, Походът на една чета през Освободителната война – 1912 г., Издание на Костурското благотворително братство, София, 1920. From Vitosha to Gramos (Hr. Silyanov, From Vitosha to Gramos, published by the Kostur charitable society, Sofia, 1920)
  Любомиръ Милетичъ, "Разорението на тракийските българи презъ 1913 година", Българска Академия на Науките, София, Държавна Печатница 1918 г. Miletich] (L. Miletich, The Destruction of Thracian Bulgarians in 1913, Bulgarian Academy of Sciences, Sofia, 1918)
  Circular letter No9 issued by a secret meeting of former IMARO activists and members of its Central committee, held on 20 December 1919, cited in a collective research of the Macedonian Scientific Institute, "Освободителните борби на Македония", part 4, Sofia, 2002, retrieved on 26 October 2007: "Поради изменилите се условия в Македония и Тракия от Балканските войни насам, организацията се преименува от ВМОРО на ВМРО, като нейната цел си остава извоюване на автономия и обединение на разпокъсаните части на Македония." 
  "Македония. История и политическа съдба", колектив на МНИ под редакцията на проф. Петър Петров, том II, Издателство "Знание", София, 1998, pp. 140–141. (In Bulgarian. In English: P. Petrov, ed. Macedonia. History and Political Fate, vol. 2, Macedonian Scientific Institute, Sofia, 1998, pp. 140–141.)
  "Македония. История и политическа съдба", колектив на МНИ под редакцията на проф. Петър Петров, том II, Издателство "Знание", София, 1998, p. 206. (In Bulgarian. In English: P. Petrov, ed. Macedonia. History and Political Fate, vol. 2, Macedonian Scientific Institute, Sofia, 1998, p. 206.)
  Р.П. Гришина, "ФОРМИРОВАНИЕ ВЗГЛЯДА НА МАКЕДОНСКИЙ ВОПРОС В БОЛЬШЕВИСТСКОЙ МОСКВЕ 1922–1924 гг." in МАКЕДОНИЯ – ПРОБЛЕМЫ ИСТОРИИ И КУЛЬТУРЫ, Институт славяноведения, Российская Академия Наук, Москва, 1999.  (R. P. Grishina "Formation of a View on the Macedonian Question in Bolshevik Moscow 1922–1924" in Macedonia. Problems of History and Culture, Institute of Slavistics, Russian Academy of Sciences, Moscow, 1999.)
  Р.П. Гришина, "ФОРМИРОВАНИЕ ВЗГЛЯДА НА МАКЕДОНСКИЙ ВОПРОС В БОЛЬШЕВИСТСКОЙ МОСКВЕ 1922–1924 гг." in МАКЕДОНИЯ – ПРОБЛЕМЫ ИСТОРИИ И КУЛЬТУРЫ, Институт славяноведения, Российская Академия Наук, Москва, 1999.  (R. P. Grishina "Formation of a View on the Macedonian Question in Bolshevik Moscow 1922–1924" in Macedonia. Problems of History and Culture, Institute of Slavistics, Russian Academy of Sciences, Moscow, 1999.)
  Р.П. Гришина, "ФОРМИРОВАНИЕ ВЗГЛЯДА НА МАКЕДОНСКИЙ ВОПРОС В БОЛЬШЕВИСТСКОЙ МОСКВЕ 1922–1924 гг." in МАКЕДОНИЯ – ПРОБЛЕМЫ ИСТОРИИ И КУЛЬТУРЫ, Институт славяноведения, Российская Академия Наук, Москва, 1999.  (R. P. Grishina "Formation of a View on the Macedonian Question in Bolshevik Moscow 1922–1924" in Macedonia. Problems of History and Culture, Institute of Slavistics, Russian Academy of Sciences, Moscow, 1999.)
  Ivo Banac, The Macedoine (pp. 307–328 in of "The National Question in Yugoslavia. Origins, History, Politics", Cornell University Press, 1984)
  "Македония. История и политическа съдба", колектив на МНИ под редакцията на проф. Петър Петров, том II, Издателство "Знание", София, 1998, pp. 205–206. (In Bulgarian. In English: P. Petrov, ed. Macedonia. History and Political Fate, vol. 2, Macedonian Scientific Institute, Sofia, 1998, pp. 205–206.)
  Palmer, S. and R. King Yugoslav Communism and the Macedonian Question, Archon Books (June 1971), pp. 65–67.

  Добрин Мичев. БЪЛГАРСКОТО НАЦИОНАЛНО ДЕЛО В ЮГОЗАПАДНА МАКЕДОНИЯ (1941–1944 г.), Македонски Преглед, 1, 1998.(Dobrin Michev, "Bulgarian National Activity in Southwest Macedonia 1941–1944", Macedonian Review, 1, 1998.)
  Palmer, S. and R. King Yugoslav Communism and the Macedonian Question, Archon Books (June 1971), pp. 112–113.
  Palmer, S. and R. King Yugoslav Communism and the Macedonian Question, Archon Books (June 1971), p. 137.
  Katardjiev's foreword to Васил Ивановски. Зошто ние, Македонците, сме одделна нација?, Скопје, 1995, pp. 49–56. (Vasil Ivanovski, Why We Macedonians Are a Separate Nation?, Skopje, 1995)
  Palmer, S. and R. King Yugoslav Communism and the Macedonian Question, Archon Books (June 1971), p. 137.
 Димитър Гоцев. НОВАТА НАЦИОНАЛНО-ОСВОБОДИТЕЛНА БОРБА ВЪВ ВАРДАРСКА МАКЕДОНИЯ. Македонски научен институт, София, 1998.
  Keith Brown. The Past in Question: Modern Macedonia and the Uncertainties of Nation, Princeton University Press (2003)

Sources 
 Пандев, К. "Устави и правилници на ВМОРО преди Илинденско-Преображенското въстание", Исторически преглед, 1969, кн. I, стр. 68–80. 
 Пандев, К. "Устави и правилници на ВМОРО преди Илинденско-Преображенското въстание", Извeстия на Института за история, т. 21, 1970, стр. 249–257. 
 Битоски, Крсте, сп. "Македонско Време", Скопје – март 1997, quoting: Quoting: Public Record Office – Foreign Office 78/4951 Turkey (Bulgaria), From Elliot, 1898, Устав на ТМОРО. S. 1. published in Документи за борбата на македонскиот народ за самостојност и за национална држава, Скопје, Универзитет "Кирил и Методиј": Факултет за филозофско-историски науки, 1981, pp 331 – 333. 
 Hugh Pouton Who Are the Macedonians?, C. Hurst & Co, 2000. p. 53. 
 Fikret Adanir, Die Makedonische Frage: ihre entestehung und etwicklung bis 1908., Wiessbaden 1979, p. 112.
 Duncan Perry The Politics of Terror: The Macedonian Liberation Movements, 1893–1903 , Durham, Duke University Press, 1988. pp. 40–41, 210 n. 10.
 Христо Татарчев, "Вътрешната македоно-одринска революционна организация като митологична и реална същност", София, 1995. 
 Dimitar Vlahov, Memoirs, 2nd edition, Slovo publishing, Skopje, 2003, . 
 Series of memoirs, published by Macedonian Scientific Institute in Sofia during the interwar period in several volumes: Slaveiko Arsov, Pando Klyashev, Ivan Popov, Smile Voidanov, Deyan Dimitrov, Nikola Mitrev, Luka Dzherov, Georgi Pop Hristov, Angel Andreev, Georgi Papanchev, Lazar Dimitrov, Damyan Gruev, Boris Sarafov, Ivan Garvanov, Yane Sandanski, Chernyo Peev, Sava Mihailov, Hristo Kuslev, Ivan Anastasov Gyrcheto, Petyr Hr. Yurukov, Nikola Pushkarov], Macedonian translations, published by Kultura, Skopje, in 2 volumes,  and 
 Георги Баждаров, "Моите спомени", издание на Институт "България – Македония", София, 2001. In English: Georgi Bazhdarov, My memoirs, published by Institute Bulgaria-Macedonia, Sofia, 2001.
 Nikola Kirov Majski, Pages from my life, Kultura, Skopje. 
 Albert Londres, Les Comitadjis (Le terrorisme dans les Balkans), Kultura, Skopje,  (original edition: Arlea, Paris, 1992).
 Albert Sonnichsen, Confessions of a Macedonian Bandit: A Californian in the Balkan Wars, The Narrative Press, . Also here Confessions, Ch. XXIV , and Macedonian translation.
 Fikret Adanir, Die Makedonische Frage, Wiesbaden, 1979.
 Константин Пандев, "Национално-освободителното движение в Македония и Одринско", София, 1979.
 Ivo Banac, "The Macedoine", pp. 307–328 in of The National Question in Yugoslavia. Origins, History, Politics, Cornell University Press, 1984.
 H. N. Brailsford, Macedonia: its races and their future, Methuen & Co., London, 1906 (Brailsford's photos)
 Христо Силянов, "Освободителнитe борби на Македония", том I и II, изд. на Илинденската Организация, София, 1933 и 1943, also volume I
 Любомиръ Милетичъ, "Разорението на тракийските българи презъ 1913 година", Българска Академия на Науките, София, Държавна Печатница, 1918 г.,
 "Македония. История и политическа съдба", колектив на МНИ под редакцията на проф. Петър Петров, том I, II и III, издателство "Знание", София, 1998.
 "Македония – проблемы истории и культуры", Институт славяноведения, Российская Академия Наук, Москва, 1999 (includes Р. П. Гришина, "Формирование взгляда на македонский вопрос в большевистской Москве 1922–1924 гг."), the complete symposium
 Никола Петров, "Кои беа партизаните во Македонија", Скопje, 1998. 
 Palmer, S. and R. King, Yugoslav Communism and the Macedonian Question, Archon Books, 1971.
 Добрин Мичев, "Българското нацинално дело в югозападна Македония (1941–1944 г.)", "Македонски Преглед", 1, 1998. 
 Keith Brown, The Past in Question: Modern Macedonia and the Uncertainties of Nation, Princeton University Press, 2003.

External links 

 Website of Macedonian VMRO-DPMNE 
 The statute of BMARC from a Macedonian language website
 The complete statute of BMARC
 History of the Greek-Macedonian Fighters (Μακεδονομάχοι – Makedonomachi), adversaries of the IMRO
 Website of Bulgarian VMRO-BND
 Macedonian site about history of IMRO – includes Dr. Tatarchev's complete memoirs

 
Kosovo vilayet
Manastir vilayet
Salonica vilayet
Adrianople vilayet
1893 establishments in the Ottoman Empire